James Collins is a Canadian songwriter, actor and singer.

Life and career 
Collins moved to Toronto to pursue a film and music career. As a songwriter, Collins has co-written, with Vancouver-based songwriter Dave Pickell, over 20 Top 40 hits in Canada.

As a singer, Collins has had three Top 40 hits – "Do You Mind If We Talk About Bill", which peaked at Number 31 on the Canadian national BDS Hot Adult Contemporary chart and "Missing You at Christmas (That's All)", peaking at number 17 on the Canadian national BDS AC chart.  Two years earlier the original version of "Missing You at Christmas (That's All)" peaked Top 30 nationally. Collins' ballad "Good Enough (To Love)" also peaked at number two on Quebec's provincial ADISQ Le Palmares Top 25 Pop Adult chart.  "Good Enough (To Love)" sat at the number two position for four weeks, behind the hit "Bad Day" by Daniel Powter.
His song, "Frozen in Time (The New Wedding Song)" is becoming a favourite for weddings in the Philippines.   There are numerous videos on YouTube featuring the song with wedding pics / couple pics montages.   One posting, alone, has well over 3 million views / listens. 

In 2003, he and Pickell co-wrote American Idol contestant Vanessa Olivarez's first single "The One", which reached number ten on the Nielsen SoundScan Canadian Singles Sales chart. Collins collaborated with American Idol Season 3 finalist Jon Peter Lewis on the song "It's Christmas."  The song peaked at Number 13 on the national Pop Adult chart (BDS) and was featured on the Canadian gold selling Now Christmas 2.  "It's Christmas" was also featured on a Christmas compilation released in Germany.

In 2006 Sony-BMG placed Collins' Christmas song, "Missing You at Christmas (That's All)", and a Christmas song he wrote with Melissa Manchester, "My Christmas Song For You" on their Platinum Christmas 3 compilation.

Collins scored a Number 1 SOCAN award (with Dave Pickell) for their tongue-in-cheek true story song, "Cyndi Lauper Said No."  The song reached No. 1 on Quebec's Top 25 Pop/Rock chart for 5 weeks in 2009.  It's the first time an indie reached Number 1 on this chart.

James also recorded a cover of Helen Reddy's # 1 worldwide hit,  "Angie Baby"....also available on iTunes...released as "Angie Baby" by Wahl Collins.

References

External links 

Canadian male television actors
Canadian male singer-songwriters
Canadian pop singers
Living people
Year of birth missing (living people)